The Mongolic languages are a language family spoken by the Mongolic peoples in Eastern Europe, Central Asia, North Asia and East Asia, mostly in Mongolia and surrounding areas and in Kalmykia and Buryatia. The best-known member of this language family, Mongolian, is the primary language of most of the residents of Mongolia and the Mongol residents of Inner Mongolia, with an estimated 5.7+ million speakers.

Classification

The Mongolic languages have no convincingly established living relatives. 

The closest relatives of the Mongolic languages appear to be the para-Mongolic languages, which include the extinct Khitan, Tuyuhun, and possibly also Tuoba languages.

A few linguists have grouped Mongolic with Turkic, Tungusic and possibly Koreanic and Japonic as part of the widely discredited Altaic family.

History

The possile precursors to Mongolic are:
 Proto-Altaic, a hypothesized prehistoric language potentially older than the Proto-Indo-European language.
 Xianbei language, heavily influenced by the Proto-Turkic (later, the Lir-Turkic) language.

The stages of Historical Mongolic are:
 Pre-Proto-Mongolic, from approximately the 4th century AD until the 12th century AD, influenced by Shaz-Turkic.
Kipchak (also known as Proto-Mongolic), from approximately the 13th century, spoken around the time of Chinggis Khan. 
 Middle Mongol, from the 13th century until the early 15th century or late 16th century, depending on classification spoken. (Given the almost entire lack of written sources for the period in between, an exact cutoff point cannot be established.) Again influenced by Turkic.
Classical Mongolian, from approximately 1700 to 1900.
 Standard Mongolian The standard Mongolian language has been in official use since 1919, and this form of the language is used in the economic, political, and social fields.

History of Written Script

 The traditional Mongolian script (based on the Old Uyghur alphabet) was first developed for Proto-Mongolic, possibly as early as the 7th century.
 In 1931, the Mongolian People's Republic adopted a Mongolian version of the Latin alphabet as the official script for Mongolian.
 Under Soviet influence, in 1941 Mongolia switched to a version of the Russian alphabet called Mongolian Cyrillic.
 In March 2020, the Mongolian government announced plans to use both Cyrillic and the traditional Mongolian script in official documents by 2025.

Languages 

Contemporary Mongolic languages are as follows. The classification and numbers of speakers follow Janhunen (2006), except for Southern Mongolic, which follows Nugteren (2011).
 
 Mongolic
 Dagur (96,000 speakers)
 Central Mongolic
Khamnigan (2,000 speakers)
 Buryat (330,000 speakers)
 Mongolian proper (5.2 million speakers)
 Eastern and Central dialect
Khalkha
 Chakhar
 Khorchin
 Ordos (123,000 speakers)
 Oirat (including Kalmyk) (360,000 speakers)
Southern Mongolic (part of a Gansu–Qinghai Sprachbund)
Shira Yugur (4,000 speakers)
 
 Monguor (150,000 speakers)
 Bonan (6,000 speakers)
 Santa (Dongxiang) (200,000 speakers)
 Kangjia (1,000 speakers)
 Moghol (extinct)

Alexander Vovin (2007) identifies the extinct Tabγač or Tuoba language as a Mongolic language. However, Chen (2005) argues that Tuoba (Tabγač) was a Turkic language. Vovin (2018) suggests that the Ruanruan language of the Rouran Khaganate was a Mongolic language, close but not identical to Middle Mongolian.

In another classificational approach, there is a tendency to call Central Mongolian a language consisting of Mongolian proper, Oirat and Buryat, while Ordos (and implicitly also Khamnigan) is seen as a variety of Mongolian proper. Within Mongolian proper, they then draw a distinction between Khalkha on the one hand and Southern Mongolian (containing everything else) on the other hand. A less common subdivision of Central Mongolic is to divide it into a Central dialect (Khalkha, Chakhar, Ordos), an Eastern dialect (Kharchin, Khorchin), a Western dialect (Oirat, Kalmyk), and a Northern dialect (consisting of two Buryat varieties). The broader delimitation of Mongolian may be based on mutual intelligibility, but an analysis based on a tree diagram such as the one above faces other problems because of the close contacts between, for example, Buryat and Khalkha Mongols during history, thus creating or preserving a dialect continuum. Another problem lies in the sheer comparability of terminology, as Western linguists use language and dialect, while Mongolian linguists use the Grimmian trichotomy language (kele), dialect (nutuγ-un ayalγu) and Mundart (aman ayalγu).

Rybatzki (2003: 388-389) recognizes the following 6 areal subgroups of Mongolic.
 Northeastern Mongolic (NE) = Dagur
 Northern Mongolic (N) = Khamnigan Mongol–Buryat
 Central Mongolic (C) = Mongol proper–Ordos–Oirat
 South-Central Mongolic (SC) = Shira Yughur
 Southeastern Mongolic (SE) = Mongghul–Mangghuer–Bonan–Santa - Kangjia
 Southwestern Mongolic (SW) = Moghol

Mixed languages 
The following are mixed Sinitic–Mongolic languages.
 Tangwang (mixed Mandarin–Santa)
 Wutun (mixed Mandarin–Bonan)

Pre-Proto-Mongolic

Pre-Proto-Mongolic is the name for the stage of Mongolic that precedes Proto-Mongolic.

Proto-Mongolic can be clearly identified chronologically with the language spoken by the Mongols during Genghis Khan's early expansion in the 1200-1210s.

Pre-Proto-Mongolic, by contrast, is a continuum that stretches back indefinitely in time. It is divided into Early Pre-Proto-Mongolic and Late Pre-Proto-Mongolic. Late Pre-Proto-Mongolic refers to the Mongolic spoken a few centuries before Proto-Mongolic by the Mongols and neighboring tribes like the Merkits and Keraits. Certain archaic words and features in Written Mongol go back past Proto-Mongolic to Late Pre-Proto-Mongolic (Janhunen 2006).

Relationship with Turkic

Pre-Proto-Mongolic has borrowed various words from Turkic languages.

In the case of Early Pre-Proto-Mongolic, certain loanwords in the Mongolic languages point to early contact with Oghur (Pre-Proto-Bulgaric) Turkic, also known as r-Turkic. These loanwords precede Common Turkic (z-Turkic) loanwords and include:
Mongolic ikere (twins) from Pre-Proto-Bulgaric ikir (versus Common Turkic ekiz)
Mongolic hüker (ox) from Pre-Proto-Bulgaric hekür (Common Turkic öküz)
Mongolic jer (weapon) from Pre-Proto-Bulgaric jer (Common Turkic yäz)
Mongolic biragu (calf) versus Common Turkic buzagu
Mongolic siri- (to smelt ore) versus Common Turkic siz- (to melt)

The above words are thought to have been borrowed from Oghur Turkic during the time of the Xiongnu.

Later Turkic peoples in Mongolia all spoke forms of Common Turkic (z-Turkic) as opposed to Oghur (Bulgharic) Turkic, which withdrew to the west in the 4th century. The Chuvash language, spoken by 1 million people in European Russia, is the only living representative of Oghur Turkic which split from Proto Turkic around the 1st century AD.

Words in Mongolic like  (brown, Common Turkic yagiz) and nidurga (fist, Common Turkic yudruk) with initial *d and *n versus Common Turkic *y are sufficiently archaic to indicate loans from an earlier stage of Oghur (Pre-Proto-Bulgaric). This is because Chuvash and Common Turkic do not differ in these features despite differing fundamentally in rhotacism-lambdacism (Janhunen 2006). Oghur tribes lived in the Mongolian borderlands before the 5th century, and provided Oghur loanwords to Early Pre-Proto-Mongolic before Common Turkic loanwords.

Altaic
Following Sergei Starostin, Martine Robbeets suggested that Mongolic languages belong to a "Transeurasian" superfamily also comprising Japonic languages, Korean, Tungusic languages and Turkic languages, but this view has been severely criticized.

Proto-Mongolic

Proto-Mongolic, the ancestor language of the modern Mongolic languages, is very close to Middle Mongol, the language spoken at the time of Genghis Khan and the Mongol Empire. Most features of modern Mongolic languages can thus be reconstructed from Middle Mongol. An exception would be the voice suffix like -caga- 'do together', which can be reconstructed from the modern languages but is not attested in Middle Mongol.

The languages of the historical Donghu, Wuhuan, and Xianbei peoples might have been related to Proto-Mongolic. For Tabghach, the language of the founders of the Northern Wei dynasty, for which the surviving evidence is very sparse, and Khitan, for which evidence exists that is written in the two Khitan scripts (large and small) which have as yet not been fully deciphered, a direct affiliation to Mongolic can now be taken to be most likely or even demonstrated.

See also 
 Inscription of Hüis Tolgoi

Notes

References

Citations

Sources 

 
 
 Janhunen, Juha. 2012. Khitan – Understanding the language behind the scripts. SCRIPTA, Vol. 4: 107–132.
 
 
 
 
 
 [Sechenbaatar] Sečenbaγatur, Qasgerel, Tuyaγ-a, B. ǰirannige, U Ying ǰe. (2005). Mongγul kelen-ü nutuγ-un ayalγun-u sinǰilel-ün uduridqal. Kökeqota: ÖMAKQ.
 
 
 
 
 Vovin, Alexander. 2007. Once again on the Tabgač language. Mongolian Studies XXIX: 191–206.

External links
 Ethnic map of Mongolia
 Monumenta Altaica grammars, texts, dictionaries and bibliographies of Mongolian and other Altaic languages

 
Mongolic–Khitan languages
Languages of Mongolia
Languages of China
Languages of Russia
Languages of Afghanistan
Languages of Kyrgyzstan